Filipino American History Month (FAHM) is celebrated in the United States during the month of October. In 1991, Filipino American National Historical Society (FANHS) board of trustees proposed the first annual Filipino American History Month to commence in October 1992.

October was chosen to commemorate the visitation of the first Filipinos who landed as slaves, prisoners, and crew aboard Novohispanic ships in what is now Morro Bay, California on October 18, 1587. It is also the birth month of Filipino American labor leader Larry Itliong.

In California and Hawaii, where many Filipino Americans reside, Filipino American History Month is celebrated annually. Many Filipino American organizations in these states often initiate their own independent celebrations. 2006 was a pivotal year as it marked the centennial celebration of Filipino migration to the United States.

While some used the term Filipino American Heritage Month interchangeably with Filipino American History Month, FANHS cites that the month should be properly focused on "history" instead of "heritage." Whereas history includes the events, experiences, and lives of people and their impact on society, "heritage" is solely about cultural traditions handed down from the past.

Arkansas 
In 2022, Filipino American History Month was recognized in Arkansas after official proclamations were issued by Governor Asa Hutchinson.

California
In California, Filipino American History Month was first recognized statewide in 2006, when the California Department of Education placed it on its celebrations calendar. In 2009, California State Senator Leland Yee introduced a resolution, which was passed, that recognizes October as Filipino American History Month. It passed the California State Assembly and was submitted to the California Secretary of State.

Hawai'i
In 2008, Filipino-American History Month was recognized by the Hawai'i State Legislature. Former State Representative Joey Manahan and members of the Filipino Caucus introduced the legislation "to designate the month of October as Filipino-American History Month to commemorate the contributions of Filipino-Americans to Hawaii and the United States." The bill passed unanimously and was signed into law by Governor Linda Lingle on April 15, 2008.

Nationally
In the 103rd Congress, a resolution to nationally recognize Filipino American History Month was introduced. The House of the 111th Congress introduced a House Resolution 155 (H. RES. 155) to officially recognize this month for Filipinos. In October 2009, the Senate of the 111th Congress passed a resolution recognizing Filipino American History Month. In November 2009, Congress passed the resolution (H. RES. 780), officially recognizing October as Filipino American History Month.

See also
Asian Pacific American Heritage Month
History of Filipino Americans

References

Filipino-American history
Asian-American culture
October observances
Commemorative months